The Man from Laramie is a 1955 American Western film directed by Anthony Mann and starring James Stewart, Arthur Kennedy, Donald Crisp, and Cathy O'Donnell.

Written by Philip Yordan and Frank Burt, the film is about a stranger who defies a local cattle baron and his sadistic son by working for one of his oldest rivals. The film was adapted from a serial of the same title by Thomas T. Flynn, first published in The Saturday Evening Post in 1954, and thereafter as a novel in 1955.

Shot in Technicolor, The Man from Laramie was one of the first Westerns to be filmed in CinemaScope to capture the vastness of the scenery.

This is the fifth and final Western collaboration between Anthony Mann and James Stewart, the other four being Winchester '73 (1950), Bend of the River (1952), The Naked Spur (1953) and The Far Country (1954).  Mann and Stewart also collaborated on three other films: Thunder Bay (1953), The Glenn Miller Story (1954) and Strategic Air Command (1955).

Plot
Will Lockhart delivers supplies from Laramie to Coronado, an isolated western town. He immediately ends up tangling with the Waggomans, influential family owning the sprawling Barb Ranch. Lockhart is quietly searching for information about someone who sold repeating rifles to the Apaches; his brother, a young lieutenant, was one of many U.S. Cavalry soldiers killed in an Apache attack on a far reach of the Barb Ranch.

Patriarch Alec Waggoman is haunted by dreams of a stranger who intends to kill his adult son, Dave. He is also gradually losing his eyesight and cannot count on the immature and impulsive Dave.
Lockhart is told by Barbara Waggoman, Alec's niece, that he can collect salt for free from a dry lake, as cargo for his return journey. But Dave Waggoman accuses him of stealing the salt, shoots most of Lockhart's mules and burns all his wagons. Lockhart returns to town, provokes a fistfight first with Dave and then ranch foreman Vic Hansbro. Alec shows up and offers Lockhart compensation for his destroyed property. Sheriff Tom Quigby suggests that Lockhart then leave town quickly to avoid trouble.

Lockhart continues searching for the gun runner. Local drunk Chris Boldt tells him that he may know something, but is seen shortly afterwards attacking Lockhart with a knife. When he is himself found stabbed dead, Sheriff Quigby briefly arrests Lockhart on suspicion for the killing.

Vic considers himself a second son to Alec and is engaged to marry Barbara. Alec depends on and respects Vic, but holds him responsible for Dave's misbehaviour, and threatens to pay the compensation for Lockhart's destroyed property out of Vic's wages.

Dave follows Lochhart and attacks him. But the gunfight ends when Dave is shot in the hand by Lockhart. Lockhart is overpowered by the Barb Ranch cowboys, who look on bewildered as Dave then shoots Lockhart through the hand with Lockhart's own gun.

Afterwards, Vic rides after Dave and catches him trying to contact the Apaches to deliver 200 repeating rifles for which the Apaches have paid Vic and Dave in advance. After being held at gunpoint by a paranoiac Dave, Vic shoots Dave in self-defense, killing him, but then lies about the incident, allowing Alec to believe that Lockhart was responsible.

Meanwhile Lockhart who is nursing his wounded hand takes refuge with a rival rancher, Kate Canady. She was Waggoman's long-ago fiancée, before he married Dave's mother, and now seeking to find a truce.

Alec goes over the ranch's account books and finds a payment for a wagon load of "fencing wire", that is very overpriced, though the Barb Ranch has no wire fences at all. He suspects that it conceals a rifle purchase and sets out to discover for himself if Dave was both stealing from him and selling rifles to the Apaches. Vic is unable to talk him out of it, so just before they reach the wagon, the two struggle and Alec is accidentally pushed off his horse and over a cliff. Assuming the old man is dead, Vic rides away.

Lockhart, who is searching for a hidden wagon load of rifles which he heard the Apache had paid for and expected to receive shortly, finds Alec wounded but still alive and takes him to Kate to tend to his wounds. When he regains consciousness, Alec is able to tell Lockhart about Dave and Vic and the rifles. Lockhart finds Vic sending a smoke signal to summon the Apaches to come for their rifles. Lockhart forces Vic to help him push the wagon off the hilltop (supposedly destroying the rifles). When he can't bring himself to kill Vic in cold blood, he tells him to just get away from him. Vic rides away, but is intercepted and killed by the Apaches.

Alec and Kate plan to get married. Barbara intends to leave Coronado, and head back east. As Lockhart leaves town, he tells Barbara she will be passing through Laramie on the way and asks her to look him up there. Saying to "ask anyone where to find Captain Lockhart" he confirms that he was an officer in the U.S. Cavalry.

Cast
 James Stewart as Will Lockhart
 Arthur Kennedy as Vic Hansbro
 Donald Crisp as Alec Waggoman
 Cathy O'Donnell as Barbara Waggoman
 Alex Nicol as Dave Waggoman
 Aline MacMahon as Kate Canady
 Wallace Ford as Charley O'Leary
 Jack Elam as Chris Boldt
 John War Eagle as Frank Darrah
 James Millican as Tom Quigby
 Gregg Barton as Fritz
 Boyd Stockman as Spud Oxton
 Frank DeKova as Padre

Production
Prior to The Man from Laramie, James Stewart and Anthony Mann had worked together on six films beginning in 1950. Stewart, impressed by Mann's work on the then-unreleased Devil's Doorway, had personally selected him to direct Winchester '73 after Fritz Lang left the production. The collaboration proved both critically and commercially successful for Stewart and raised Mann's profile enormously after a string of low-budget crime films. After Winchester '73, Mann directed Stewart in the westerns Bend of the River, The Naked Spur, and The Far Country, as well as the biographical drama The Glenn Miller Story and the adventure film Thunder Bay. The two would also collaborate for a final time on the military aviation film Strategic Air Command. However, The Man from Laramie would prove to be the last western that the two made together. 

Producer Aaron Rosenberg says that the reason Stewart and Mann never worked together for a sixth Western collaboration after The Man from Laramie was a disagreement over the quality of Night Passage. Mann had been slated to direct the film and worked with Stewart on preproduction, but disagreed with the casting of Audie Murphy and had an argument with Stewart in which the veteran director dismissed the film as "trash". Mann quit the movie, replaced by director James Neilson, feeling that Stewart was only making the film so he could play his accordion. This enraged Stewart so much that the two didn't speak again.

Theme song
The film's theme song was written by Lester Lee and Ned Washington. It was recorded in the United States by Al Martino and in the United Kingdom by Jimmy Young. Young's version reached number-one the UK Singles Chart in October 1955, remaining there for four weeks, while Martino's version peaked at number 19 in the chart that September.

Chart performance

Jimmy Young

Al Martino

See also
List of American films of 1955

References

External links

 
 
 
 
 

1955 films
1955 Western (genre) films
American Western (genre) films
CinemaScope films
Columbia Pictures films
1950s English-language films
Films scored by George Duning
Films based on American novels
Films based on Western (genre) novels
Films directed by Anthony Mann
Films shot in New Mexico
Revisionist Western (genre) films
1950s American films